Emily Cockayne (born 1973) is a British historian, known for her work on sensory nuisance and material culture.

Education
Cockayne was educated at the University of Cambridge, where she took a first-class degree in history in 1994. She received the Members' History Prize in 1997. She wrote a doctoral thesis at Jesus College, Cambridge, under the supervision of Robert W. Scribner and Keith Wrightson, and was awarded her PhD in 2000. She was a Prize Fellow of Magdalen College, Oxford, and afterwards lectured at the Open University. She is currently Associate Professor in Early Modern History at the University of East Anglia.

Career
In 2007, Cockayne published Hubbub. Filth, Noise & Stench in England 1600-1770. A reviewer in The Independent commented: 'Cockayne draws us into a world where snickleways (narrow, often noisome passages) might be contaminated by fallen axunge (pig fat used to grease axles) or the overflow from a "house of easement"'. The book has been described as 'a treasure-house of material for scholars'. Toni Morrison said Hubbub was 'a really extraordinary book', and that it had influenced her 2008 novel A Mercy. Hubbub is often included in academic bibliographies of seminal works in modern urban history and the history of everyday life. A second edition of Hubbub was issued in 2021 with a new afterword.

Cheek by Jowl. A History of Neighbours followed in 2012. A reviewer in Literary Review described Cheek by Jowl as 'authoritative if heavy-going'; while The Telegraph noted that 'Cockayne does not marshal her subject particularly linearly ... [but] crisply accounts for our disappearing notion of neighbourliness'.

In 2020, Cockayne published a history of recycling and material reuse entitled Rummage. The Guardian hailed Rummage as 'brilliantly original and deeply-researched', while The Sunday Times called it 'rich and meticulous'.

In addition to her academic work, which has included contributions to the history of Magdalen College Oxford and essays on noise and deafness in Urban History and The Historical Journal respectively, Cockayne has written for Architectural Review; The Daily Telegraph; The Times; Times Literary Supplement; and The Wall Street Journal. She has appeared on BBC Radio 4 programmes Thinking Allowed and Woman's Hour; BBC Radio 3's The Listening Service; and in international broadcasts.

Cockayne is working on a study of anonymous letter-writing for Oxford University Press.

Personal life 
Cockayne lives in East Anglia. She has two children, Ned and Maud.

Books
Hubbub. Filth, Noise & Stench in England 1600-1770 (Yale University Press, 2007). 
Cheek by Jowl. A History of Neighbours (Bodley Head, 2012). 
Rummage. A History of the Things We Have Reused, Recycled and Refused to Let Go (Profile, 2020).

References

External links
https://www.uea.ac.uk/history/people/profile/e-cockayne
https://www.rummage.work

1973 births
21st-century British historians
British women historians
Academics of the Open University
Living people
Alumni of Jesus College, Cambridge
Academics of the University of East Anglia
Fellows of Magdalen College, Oxford
21st-century British women writers